Erik Šuľa (born 30 May 1995) is a Slovak professional footballer who plays for Scottish League One club Clyde as a defender.

Club career

FC Nitra
Šuľa made his Fortuna Liga debut for Nitra against ViOn Zlaté Moravce on 17 October 2020.

Clyde
Šuľa signed for Scottish League One club Clyde in August 2022.

References

External links
 MFK Zemplín Michalovce official club profile 
 
 
 Futbalnet profile 

1995 births
Living people
Sportspeople from Poprad
Slovak footballers
Slovak expatriate footballers
Association football defenders
FK Poprad players
Partizán Bardejov players
FK Fotbal Třinec players
FC Nitra players
MFK Zemplín Michalovce players
2. Liga (Slovakia) players
Slovak Super Liga players
Expatriate footballers in the Czech Republic
Slovak expatriate sportspeople in the Czech Republic
Clyde F.C. players
Slovak expatriate sportspeople in Scotland
Expatriate footballers in Scotland